Zahra Shojaei is an Iranian politician. A major advocate of women's rights in Iran, she was the advisor on women's affairs under President Khatami, and as such a member of his cabinet from 1997-2005.

Center for Women's Participation
In 1997, Khatami created the Center for Women's Participation, which then became the main institution responsible for handling women's affairs in the country, affiliated with the presidency. When Ahmadinejad took the presidency in 2005, he renamed it Center for Women and Family Affairs (Markaz-e Omor-e Zanan va Khanevadeh Riasat-e Jomhuri).

Appointment to Iranian Cabinet
President Khatami appointed Zahra Shojaei as his advisor on women's affairs (a position formerly held by Shahla Habibi) and the head of the Center for Women's Participation. This appointment made her a member of the Iranian Presidential Cabinet.  Zahra Shojaei, along with Masoumeh Ebtekar, participated in the first cabinet since the Islamic Revolution to include women.

Transition
With the election of President Mahmoud Ahmadinejad 2005, Nasrin Soltankhah was appointed to Shojaei's post. The center was renamed Center for Women and Family Affairs, as opposed to Center for Women's Participation as it was called under Khatami. Participation was no longer a policy emphasis.

External links
The Position of Women in Iran: Past Achievements and Future Prospects

Presidential advisers of Iran
Iranian women's rights activists
Living people
Islamic Iran Participation Front politicians
21st-century Iranian women politicians
21st-century Iranian politicians
Secretaries-General of political parties in Iran
1956 births